Sam Mark took over the failing Fall River United at the end of the 1921-22 season and relaunched the club as the Fall River F.C. this season. Also, following the 1921-22 season, the Philadelphia F.C. club was transferred "back" to Bethlehem as the reorganized Bethlehem Steel F.C. and a new team was organized in Philadelphia to take its place.

Statistics of American Soccer League in season 1922–23.

League standings

Goals leaders

References 

The Year in American Soccer - 1923

American Soccer League (1921–1933) seasons
American Soccer League, 1922-23